N-myc-interactor also known as N-myc and STAT interactor is a protein that in humans is encoded by the NMI gene.

Function 

NMYC interactor (NMI) interacts with NMYC and CMYC (two members of the oncogene Myc family), and other transcription factors containing a Zip, HLH, or HLH-Zip motif. The NMI protein also interacts with all STATs except STAT2 and augments STAT-mediated transcription in response to cytokines IL-2 and IFN-gamma. The NMI mRNA has low expression levels in all human fetal and adult tissues tested except brain and has high expression in cancer cell line-myeloid leukemias.

Interactions
NMI (gene) has been shown to interact with BRCA1, IFI35, Myc, and STAT5A, and TUBA3C.

References

Further reading

Human proteins